Guido Andreozzi and Ignacio Carou were the defending champions but lost in the semifinals to Chung Yun-seong and Christian Langmo.

Daniel Dutra da Silva and Oleg Prihodko won the title after defeating Chung and Langmo 6–2, 6–2 in the final.

Seeds

Draw

References

External links
 Main draw

Challenger de Tigre II - Doubles